Massimiliano "Max" Blardone (born 26 November 1979) is a retired World Cup alpine ski racer from Italy. He specialized in the discipline of giant slalom. Since 2016 he has been a sports commentator for RAI.

Biography
Born in Domodossola in the Piedmont region of northwest Italy, Blardone made his World Cup debut at Sölden, Austria, in October 2000. He made his first World Cup podium in 2004 and his first victory came in 2005. Blardone won seven World Cup races and attained 25 podiums, all in giant slalom. He finished second in the giant slalom season standings in 2006 and 2007, and third in 2004. Blardone represented Italy in three Olympics and six world championships.

At the end of his career as an athlete he embarked on that of sports commentator of alpine skiing in RAI, starting from the 2019-20 season he supports the commentator Davide Labate in the commentary on the men's competitions.

World Cup results

Season standings

Race podiums
 7 wins – (7 GS)        
 25 podiums – (25 GS)

World Championship results

Olympic results

See also
 Italian skiers World Cup podiums

References

External links

Alpine skiers of Fiamme Gialle

1979 births
Living people
People from Domodossola
Italian male alpine skiers
Olympic alpine skiers of Italy
Alpine skiers at the 2002 Winter Olympics
Alpine skiers at the 2006 Winter Olympics
Alpine skiers at the 2010 Winter Olympics
Sportspeople from the Province of Verbano-Cusio-Ossola
Italian alpine skiing coaches
21st-century Italian people